Abu Hammu II (died 1389) was a Zayyanid Sultan of the Kingdom of Tlemcen in Algeria in the 14th century.

Also known as Abu Hammu Musa II he first came to power in Tlemcen and surrounding area with the expulsion of the Merinids in 1359.  The following year Abu Hammu was succeeded in power by Abu Zayyan Muhammad II ibn Uthman.  Before 1360 was over though Abu Hammu returned to power.  He was again succeeded in power by Abu Zayyan in 1370.  Abu Hammu returned to power a third time in 1372.  He lost power to Abu Zayyan again in 1383, but returned to power a fourth time in 1384.  In 1387 Abu Zayyan again returned to power, but died that year, so Abu Hammu returned to power, and retained it until his death in 1389.

The era of his rule is known as a prosperous time for the realm in arts, ceremonies, military by the reconquest of the Zayyanid domain (From Muluya river in the west to the Soumman and Kebir rivers in the east and Trans Saharan trades routes cities in the south) and the defusing of the threats towards its realm by tactics from the rivals also being able to conquering territories of their domains re-establishing the Zayyanid Sultanate of Tlemcen and Central Maghreb territories size like during the Sultans before him domains as it was during his father Abu Tashfin I before the conquest of Hafsid Ifrqiya and the alliance between Hafsids and Marinids which will result the martyr of Abu Tashfin during the siege of Tlemcen from 1335-1337, Musa II were educated in Grenada the capital of the Nasrid Sultanate the allies of the Zayyanids who often helped them against the Marinids like during the first siege of Tlemcen despite it didn't work since Abu Yaqub Yusuf an Nasr were more interested in Tlemcen than protecting his own domain in Morocco from the threat of a new heir supported by Nasirds to the throne of Fes who had conquered many cities in the north, Abu Hammu II reconquered the territory of his ancestors after the death of Abu Inan Faris by the support of Grenada and the recruits of his legitimate ancestral domain.
 
Abu Hammu was succeeded as ruler of the Zayyanid domains by Abu Tashufin Abd al-Rahman II.

References
articles on kingdoms of North Africa

1389 deaths
14th-century Berber people
Berber rulers
Year of birth missing
Zayyanid dynasty